Hilary J. Crichton is a British chemist currently the Editor-in-Chief of Biopolymers.

References

21st-century British women scientists
British women chemists
Year of birth missing (living people)
Living people